Martin Akakia (1500–1551) was a physician of King Francis I of France.  He was born at Châlons-en-Champagne, his real name being Aquaqia.

1551 deaths
16th-century French physicians
Academic staff of the Collège de France
1500 births